The governor of Idaho is the head of government of Idaho and commander-in-chief of the state's military forces. The officeholder has the duty to see state laws are executed, power to either approve or veto bills passed by the Idaho Legislature. The current governor of Idaho is Republican Brad Little, who took office on January 7, 2019.

Thirty-one individuals have held the office of governor of Idaho since the state's admission to the Union in 1890, two of whom served non-consecutive terms. The state's first governor, George L. Shoup, had the shortest term, of three months; Cecil Andrus had the longest, of 14 years.

Governors

Governors of the Territory of Idaho
Idaho Territory was created from Dakota Territory, Nebraska Territory, and Washington Territory on March 4, 1863.

There were sixteen territorial governors appointed by the president of the United States from the territory's organization in 1863 until the formation of the state of Idaho in 1890. Due to the long distance from Washington, D.C. to Boise, there was often a lengthy gap between a governor being appointed and his arrival in the territory; four resigned before even arriving.

Governors of the State of Idaho

Idaho was admitted to the Union on July 3, 1890. The terms for governor and lieutenant governor are 4 years, commencing on the first Monday in the January following the election. Prior to 1946, the offices were elected to terms of two years. If the office of governor is vacant or the governor is out of state or unable to discharge his duties, the lieutenant governor acts as governor until such time as the disability is removed.  If both the offices of governor and lieutenant governor are vacant or both those officers are unable to fulfill their duties, the President pro tempore of the Idaho Senate is next in line, and then the Speaker of the Idaho House of Representatives. After the change to four-year terms, self-succession (re-election) was not initially allowed; newly elected Governor Robert E. Smylie, formerly the state's attorney general, successfully lobbied the 1955 legislature to propose an amendment to the state constitution to allow gubernatorial re-election, which was approved by voters in the 1956 general election. There is no limit to the number of terms a governor may serve.

See also

List of lieutenant governors of Idaho
Gubernatorial lines of succession in the United States#Idaho
List of Idaho state legislatures
Elections in Idaho

Notes

References

General

 
 
 
 
 
 
 

Constitution

 

Specific

External links

 Office of the Governor of Idaho

 
Idaho, Governors of
Governors